Sub-national opinion polling for the 2015 Spanish general election may refer to:
Regional opinion polling for the 2015 Spanish general election
Constituency opinion polling for the 2015 Spanish general election